Lane Cottage is a historic cure cottage located at Saranac Lake, town of North Elba in Essex County, New York.  It was built about 1923 and is an "L" shaped frame structure clad in cedar shingles with a jerkinhead gable roof in the Shingle Style.  It features an open gable portico with gracefully curved gable returns and a cure porch.  It was built by Edward Shaw for his wife, who had tuberculosis. The Shaws had two young children; fearing that they would contract TB from Mrs. Shaw, a separate house was built for them, nearby.

It was listed on the National Register of Historic Places in 1992.

References

Houses on the National Register of Historic Places in New York (state)
Houses completed in 1923
Shingle Style houses
Houses in Essex County, New York
National Register of Historic Places in Essex County, New York
Shingle Style architecture in New York (state)